Tracks is the sixth studio album by American country music artist Collin Raye. It contains the singles "Couldn't Last a Moment", "Loving This Way" (also known as "Tired of Loving This Way"), and "You Still Take Me There". "Couldn't Last a Moment" was Raye's final Top 40 hit on the Billboard country charts at number 3, while the other two singles both failed to reach Top 40. Two of this album's tracks were later recorded by Kenny Rogers: "Harder Cards" on his 2003 album Back to the Well, and "Water and Bridges" on his 2006 album of the same name.

Track listing

Personnel
Compiled from liner notes.

Musicians
 Tim Akers – keyboards
 Mike Brignardello – bass guitar
 Joe Chemay – bass guitar
 Eric Darken – percussion
 Bobbie Eakes – vocals on "Loving This Way"
 Paul Franklin – steel guitar
 Aubrey Haynie – fiddle, mandolin
 Wes Hightower – background vocals
 John Hobbs – keyboards
 Dann Huff – electric guitar
 Gordon Kennedy – electric guitar
 Jeff King – electric guitar
 Paul Leim – drums
 B. James Lowry – acoustic guitar
 Brent Mason – electric guitar
 Gene Miller – background vocals
 Nashville String Machine – strings
 Steve Nathan – keyboards
 Collin Raye – lead vocals
 Chris Rodriguez – background vocals
 Matt Rollings – keyboards
 Biff Watson – acoustic guitar
 Lonnie Wilson – drums

Technical
 Jeff Balding – recording, mixing (all tracks except 7 and 11)
 Mark Hagen – recording (all tracks except 7 and 11)
 Dann Huff – production (all tracks except 7 and 11)
 Mike Poole – recording (tracks 7 and 11)
 Collin Raye – production
 Clarke Schleicher – recording, mixing (tracks 7 and 11)
 Paul Worley – production (tracks 7 and 11)

Chart performance

References

2000 albums
Albums produced by Dann Huff
Albums produced by Paul Worley
Epic Records albums
Collin Raye albums